Tayibe, Et Tayibe or Et Taibeh is a village in the  Marjeyoun District in south Lebanon.

Name
According to E. H. Palmer, the name Tayibe means "The good, sweet, or wholesome" (about water).

Archaeological site
By the village is a  Heavy Neolithic archaeological site of the Qaraoun culture.

The site was discovered by Louis Dubertret and materials studied by Jacques Cauvin. Heavy Neolithic materials recovered resembled those from Qaraoun.

History
In 1875, Victor Guérin found here a village with 800 Metualis. He further noted: "Its principal mosque, now in ruins, is built of superb blocks, apparently ancient. It contains in the interior several monolithic columns."

In 1881, the PEF's Survey of Western Palestine  (SWP) noted  here: "There are several sarcophagi and cisterns in the village ; some caves near." They further described it as: "A large well-built village, built of stone, containing about 600 Metawileh and 400 Moslems. The Caimacam has a good house here. There are some figs and olives round the village and arable land; water is supplied from a spring and two birkets."

Modern era
On  August 5, during the 2006 Lebanon War,   Israeli war-planes  killed 3 civilians, aged 2 to 48 years of age. The IDF offered no explanations to the strike.

See also

Battle of Ayta ash-Shab

References

Bibliography

External links 
Taybeh (Marjaayoun), Localiban
Survey of Western Palestine, Map 2:   IAA, Wikimedia commons

Archaeological sites in Lebanon
Heavy Neolithic sites
Populated places in the Israeli security zone 1985–2000
Neolithic settlements
Populated places in Marjeyoun District